El Cobre or Cobre is a Spanish word meaning "Copper". It may also refer to:

Places
Cobre, Nevada, ghost town in Elko County, Nevada, United States
Cobre (Vegadeo), a village of Vegadeo, Asturias, Spain
El Cobre, Cuba, a mining town in Santiago de Cuba. Famous as the pilgrimage location for the Our Lady of Charity Sanctuary
El Cobre, Táchira, town in Venezuela

Other
El Cobre (cigars), manufactured in Nicaragua by the Oliva company
Cobre mine, the name of various copper mines

See also
Cobres, a municipality of Salta Province, Argentina
San Antonio de los Cobres, a municipality of Salta Province, Argentina